The Virginia Slims of Albuquerque is a defunct WTA Tour-affiliated women's tennis tournament played from 1989 to 1991. It was held in Albuquerque, New Mexico in the United States and played on outdoor hard courts.

Past finals

Singles

Doubles

References
 WTA Results Archive

 
Hard court tennis tournaments in the United States
Tennis in New Mexico
Sports in Albuquerque, New Mexico
Recurring sporting events established in 1989
Recurring sporting events disestablished in 1991
Defunct tennis tournaments in the United States
Virginia Slims tennis tournaments
1989 disestablishments in New Mexico
1991 establishments in New Mexico
History of women in New Mexico